Kamratmästerskapen (literally, "The Comrade Championships") was a Swedish football cup tournament played 1901–1924 and 1940–1945. The tournament was open only to teams of the Idrottsföreningen Kamraterna association, but was still an important tournament in the early years of Swedish football.

Previous winners

Cup champions

References 

Print

Idrottsföreningen Kamraterna
Defunct football competitions in Sweden
1901 establishments in Sweden
1945 disestablishments in Sweden
Recurring sporting events established in 1901